The Hunchback of Notre-Dame is an 1831 novel by Victor Hugo.

The Hunchback of Notre Dame may also refer to the novel's adaptations:

Films 
The Hunchback of Notre Dame (1911 film), a French film released as Notre-Dame de Paris
The Hunchback of Notre Dame (1923 film), a silent film starring Lon Chaney, Sr. as Quasimodo
The Hunchback of Notre Dame (1939 film), featuring Charles Laughton
The Hunchback of Notre Dame (1956 film), with Anthony Quinn
The Hunchback of Notre Dame (1982 film), starring Anthony Hopkins and Derek Jacobi
The Hunchback of Notre Dame (1986 film), an Australian animated film
The Hunchback of Notre Dame (1996 film), an animated film by Walt Disney Animation Studios
The Hunchback of Notre Dame, a 1996 animated film by Golden Films
The Hunchback of Notre Dame, a 1996 animated film by Jetlag Productions
The Hunchback of Notre Dame, a 1996 animated film by Burbank Animation Studios
The Hunchback of Notre Dame II, a 2002 direct-to-video sequel to the Walt Disney film

In television and radio 
The Hunchback of Notre Dame (1966 TV series), a British television series
The Hunchback of Notre Dame (1976 film), a British feature-length adaptation
The Hunchback of Notre-Dame, a radio drama produced by Radio Tales for National Public Radio

In music 
The Hunchback of Notre Dame, an album by Alec R. Costandinos and the Syncophonic Orchestra
The Hunchback of Notre Dame (Dennis DeYoung album), a 1996 recording of music written by Dennis DeYoung for his musical adaptation
The Hunchback of Notre Dame (soundtrack), the soundtrack to Disney's 1996 animated feature
The Hunchback of Notre Dame (musical), based on the 1996 Disney film

Other uses 
The Hunchback of Notre Dame (franchise)
The Hunchback of Notre Dame, a ballet choreographed by Ronald Hynd in 1988
Vox Lumiere - Hunchback of Notre Dame in 2005 by composer Kevin Saunders Hayes

See also
Der Glöckner von Notre Dame, a 1999 Berlin musical adapted from the Disney adaptation
Hunchback (disambiguation)
Klokkeren fra Notre Dame (musical), a 2002 Danish musical written and composed by Knud Christensen (better known as Sebastian), based on the Hugo novel
Notre-Dame de Paris (musical), a 1998 French musical